Muk-dong is a dong, neighbourhood of Jungnang-gu in Seoul, South Korea.

See also 
Administrative divisions of South Korea

References

Seoul wonmuk elementary school
www.wonmuk.es.kr

Seoul Wonmuk elementary school is located in Muk il dong Jung-rang-gu Seoul. It was opened on November 10, 1995. The first graduation was held on March 1, 1996. The school motto is 'Be wise, Be truthful, Be healthy'. The school's symbols are pine tree and azalea. The school has many extracurricular activities such as violin, origami, broadcasting, scientific experimenting, baduk, etc.

-History-
1995. 06. 05 Wonmuk elementary school was established 
1995. 11. 10 Gim-gwang-jeong was appointed as the first principal. 14 classes were organized
1996. 02. 16 The 1st graduation ceremony was held
1998. 03. 01 A total of 39 classes were organized
1999. 03. 01 A total of 40 classes were organized 
2000. 09. Jeong-jae-seong was appointed as the second principal
2003. 09. 01 Gang-sun-yeol was appointed as the third principal 
2005. 03. 02 Gang-dae-hui was appointed as the fourth principal 
2007. 06. 11 Gim-myeong-uk was appointed as the fifth principal 
2010. 3. Gim-hyeon-muk was appointed as the sixth principal

External links
 Jungnang-gu official website in English
 Tourism of Jungnang-gu at the Jungnang-gu official website
 Muk 1-dong resident office website

Neighbourhoods of Jungnang District